Ali Abdel Sami (born 6 January 1936) is an Egyptian rower. He competed in the 1964 Summer Olympics.

References

External links
 
 
 
 

1936 births
Living people
Rowers at the 1964 Summer Olympics
Egyptian male rowers
Olympic rowers of Egypt